The Meknes Chamber of Traditional Artisanship is a Moroccan government organization charged with the promotion of traditional Moroccan handicrafts though the training of artisans and craftsmen in the Meknes-Tafilalet region.  Although the main campus is located in the city of Meknes, there are four satellite campuses spread around the region in Hajeb, Ifrane, Khenifra and Rashidiyya.

Activities 
The Chamber provides training in many of the traditional Moroccan handicrafts including: woodcarving, carpet making, decorative iron working, leather tanning, pottery, and traditional garment making.

Examples of the Chamber's Activities

References 

Meknes
Woodworking
Moroccan art